Gregory Prange is an American film editor, television director and producer. He did production work on One Tree Hill and Dawson's Creek.

Career
Prange has held positions on One Tree Hill, Dawson's Creek, Dying to Belong, French Silk and various other director and editorial roles.

Personal life
Greg Prange is the father of Ian Prange whose ex-spouse was Hilarie Burton. Both Burton and Prange are heavily connected to the One Tree Hill TV series.

Awards and nominations
Prange was nominated for an ALMA Award in 2001 for Outstanding Director of a Drama Series. The nomination was for his directing role in Dawson's Creek. He also received a nomination for a Primetime Emmy Award in 1988 for Outstanding Editing for a Miniseries or a Special - Single Camera Production. The Emmy nomination was for To Heal a Nation and was shared with 
Millie Moore.

Filmography
Selected filmography

Director

Producer
 Young Americans
 Fantasy Island

Editor

References

American television directors
American television producers
Living people
Place of birth missing (living people)
Year of birth missing (living people)
American film editors